Meiacanthus tongaensis is a species of combtooth blenny found in the Pacific ocean where it is only known from Tonga.  This species grows to a length of  SL.

References

tongaensis
Fish described in 1987